Emiliano González Arqués (born 20 September 1969) is a retired footballer who played as a striker. Born and raised in Spain, he moved to Andorra at 21, when he was signed by FC Andorra, and ultimately became a naturalised citizen of Andorra and represented the Andorra national team. He earned 36 international caps between 1998 and 2003.

References

External links

 

1969 births
Living people
Footballers from Santander, Spain
Spanish footballers
Spanish emigrants to Andorra
Rayo Cantabria players
FC Andorra players
Segunda División B players
Tercera División players
Andorran footballers
Andorra international footballers
Association football forwards